VOICE ～cover you with love～ is Tomiko Van's second solo album and her first cover album, released on March 28, 2007 by Avex Trax. The album comes in two different versions; a CD+DVD version and a CD only version. While "Coffee Rumba" (Moliendo Café) is a Jose Manzo Perroni cover, the first recording of this song into Japanese was in 1961 by Sachiko Nishida; Van actually covered Yōsui Inoue's 2001 version. The song "TRUTH'94" had already been released by Van on TRF's single "Where to begin" in early 2006.

Track listing

CD
 "Home" (Yuka Kawamura cover)
  (Ann Lewis cover)
  (Motoharu Sano cover)
  ("Moliendo Café") (Jose Manzo Perroni cover)
  (Kyōko Koizumi cover)
  (Aska cover)
  (Mayumi Itsuwa cover)
  (Kyu Sakamoto cover)
 "TRUTH'94" (TRF cover)
 "If" (Bread cover)
 
  (Bonus Track)

DVD
 Music Clip

Personnel
Tomiko Van - vocals

Charts
Oricon Sales Chart (Japan)

2007 albums
Tomiko Van albums
Japanese-language albums
Avex Trax albums